Caboblanco is a 1980 American drama film directed by J. Lee Thompson, starring Charles Bronson, Dominique Sanda and Jason Robards. The film has often been described as a remake of Casablanca.

The movie marks the third collaboration between Bronson and director J. Lee Thompson (following 1976's St. Ives and 1977's The White Buffalo).

Plot
Giff Hoyt (Bronson), a cafe owner in Cabo Blanco, Peru after World War II is caught between refuge-seeking Nazis and their enemies. After the murder of a sea explorer is passed off as accidental death by the corrupt local police, Giff becomes suspicious. The police chief (Rey) also intimidates a new arrival Marie (Sanda), and Giff intervenes to help her. Giff suspects Beckdorff (Robards), a Nazi refugee living in the area. Beckdorff, it emerges, is seeking to uncover sunken treasure.

Cast

Production
Bronson said, "I was drawn to it because it didn't have too much violence in it. The script read and smelled like the kind of thing I enjoyed as a kid, something far away from the mines."

According to co-producer Lance Hool, there was a two-hour version of the film released in 1979 to Italy, France, Sweden, Portugal, Greece, Argentina, and Venezuela that contained additional chase and action scenes. After being turned down for distribution by all the major studios, director Thompson then supervised cuts for a 96- and 87-minute version. Clifton James' role as an American tourist was completely excised, although his name still appears on the credits.

Reception

Critical response
The film was poorly received by critics, described as an "appalling rehash" of Casablanca and as "indescribably inept" by Time Out. Halliwell's Film Guide  described it as a "witless spoof of Casablanca which seems to have been cobbled together from a half-finished negative."

Jerry Vermilye states that the movie's producers advised the trade press that it was not a remake of Casablanca, arguing that the similarities were very limited.

References

External links 
 
 

1980 films
1980s adventure drama films
American adventure drama films
1980s English-language films
Films directed by J. Lee Thompson
Films scored by Jerry Goldsmith
Films set in Peru
Films set in 1948
1980 drama films
1980s American films